FightWorld is an 2018 American docu-series, exploring the diverse fighting techniques found in cultures around the world. In each installment of the series, Frank Grillo travels to a different country to embed in the local fight culture, exploring various disciplines such as Wrestling, Muay Thai and Lethwei.

Cast
 Frank Grillo

Release
It was released on October 12, 2018 on Netflix streaming.

References

External links
 
 
 

2010s American documentary television series
2018 American television series debuts
English-language Netflix original programming
Netflix original documentary television series